San Domenico is a Romanesque-style Roman Catholic church in Prato, region of Tuscany, central Italy.

History

Construction of the church and adjacent monastery was begun in 1282, and continued till 1325. The bell-tower was added in 1313. Only the first story of the church facade was faced with green and white marble and stone, while the superior portions remain in unadorned brick. The external arches are attributed to Giovanni Pisano. The portal of the church has heraldic symbols recalling the patronage of Cardinal Niccolò Albertini, in its construction. 

The interior altars house a 14th-century painted wooden crucifix and an Annunciation by Matteo Rosselli (1578-1650). The cloister of the adjacent convent was built in 1478-80. An adjacent museum has works of wall frescoes.

Images

References

Romanesque architecture in Tuscany
Churches completed in 1325
14th-century Roman Catholic church buildings in Italy
Buildings and structures completed in 1313
Towers completed in the 14th century
Domenico